Nicole Calfan (born 4 March 1947) is a French actress and author.

Filmography

Theater

Author

References

External links
 

1947 births
Living people
Actresses from Paris
French film actresses
French television actresses
French stage actresses
Writers from Paris
20th-century French actresses
20th-century French women writers
20th-century French non-fiction writers
21st-century French actresses
21st-century French women writers
21st-century French non-fiction writers